Ken Owers (born 30 March 1953) is an English former professional snooker player.

Career

Born in 1953, Owers turned professional in 1986. He saw immediate success, reaching the last 16 at his first tournament, the 1986 International Open. There, he defeated John Hargreaves 5–3, George Scott 5–1, Jimmy White 5–2 and Dene O'Kane 5–0, before losing 1–5 to Neal Foulds. Later in the same season he reached the last 16 at the 1987 English Professional Championship, exiting 2–6 to Mike Hallett, and twice beat the veteran Fred Davis - 5–3 in the British Open, and 10–5 in the 1987 World Championship, where he eventually lost in the last 64 to Warren King.

The following season, Owers beat Mick Fisher 5–0 and Rex Williams 5–3 before losing 0–5 to Peter Francisco in the last 32 at the 1988 Classic, and again progressed to the last 16 of the English Professional Championship, this time losing 4–6 to Tony Knowles. Owers won the 1989 WPBSA Invitational Event Two beating Dave Gilbert 9–6 in the final.

By the 1989/1990 season, Owers' form had dipped dramatically, and that season yielded only £500 in prize money, when he reached the last 64 at the 1990 European Open; there, he lost 2–5 to a declining Alex Higgins.

At the 1990 World Championship, Owers beat Mike Darrington 10–1, but was eliminated in the last 96, losing 8–10 to another fading former World Champion, John Spencer.

The next season brought a welcome return to form in patches; most notably, Owers reached the last 16 at a ranking event for the first time in four years at the 1990 Grand Prix. There, he was victorious over Gary Natale, Brian Rowswell, John Virgo and Knowles, before losing once more to Peter Francisco - this time taking the third frame in a 1–5 defeat.

This proved to be Owers' last showing in the latter stages of a tournament; at the 1993 World Championship, he lost his second-round qualifying match 0–10 to a young Drew Henry, having beaten Sefton Payne 5–1 in the first round.

In the last 64 at the 1993 Grand Prix, Owers again faced Neal Foulds but lost 3–5, making a break of 57 in the eighth frame before Foulds replied with 72 to seal victory.

In the 1997 World Championship, Owers lost 5–10 to Leigh Robinson in his first qualifying match; this was his final competitive match, as his world ranking, having slipped to 256th, was not sufficient to keep him on the main tour. He thus left professional snooker, aged 44.

Non-ranking wins: (1)
 WPBSA Non-ranking Event 2 - 1989

References

1953 births
Living people
English snooker players